Drago is an Italian surname. Notable people with the surname include:

Billy Drago (1945–2019), stage name of American actor William Eugene Burrows 
Dick Drago (born 1945), American baseball player
Filippo Drago (pharmacologist) (born 1954), Italian pharmacologist
Gago Drago (born 1985), stage name of Armenian kickboxer Gagik Harutyunyan
Luis María Drago (1859–1921), Argentine politician
Massimo Drago (born 1971), Italian football player and coach
Russell S. Drago (1928–1997), American chemist
Tony Drago (born 1965), Maltese snooker and pool player

See also
Blackie Drago, a Marvel Comics super-villain known as the Vulture
Drago (given name)
Ivan Drago, a fictional professional boxer from the Rocky film series
Prince del Drago, 1860–1956, Italian noble and New York socialite

Italian-language surnames